Rapicactus mandragora, synonym Turbinicarpus mandragora, is a species of plant in the family Cactaceae.

It is endemic to Coahuila state in Mexico. Its natural habitat is hot deserts. It is a Critically Endangered species, threatened by habitat destruction.

References

External links

Cactoideae
Cacti of Mexico
Endemic flora of Mexico
Flora of Coahuila
Critically endangered plants
Endangered biota of Mexico
Taxonomy articles created by Polbot